Grand Théâtre tram stop is located on line  of the tramway de Bordeaux.

Location 
The station is located at cours de l'Intendance in Bordeaux.

Junctions 
There are no junctions with other tram lines or buses at this station.

Close by 
 Grand Théâtre
 Cours de l'Intendance
 Allées de Tourny
 Église Notre-Dame
 Rue Sainte-Catherine, plus grande rue piétonne d'Europe

See also 
 TBC
 Tramway de Bordeaux

External links 
 

Bordeaux tramway stops
Tram stops in Bordeaux
Railway stations in France opened in 2004